The 1908 Rutgers Queensmen football team represented Rutgers University as an independent during the 1908 college football season. In their first and only season under head coach Joseph T. Smith, the Queensmen compiled a 3–5–1 record and were outscored by their opponents, 104 to 53. The team captain was Charles E. Corbin.

The Rutgers yearbook put a positive spin on the season: "The football season of 1908 turned out to be very successful, considering the poor prospects which seemed to face us before the opening of college in the fall."

Schedule

Players
The following players earned varsity letters for their participation on the 1908 football team: 
 James Woods Babcock, Paterson, NJ, Class of 1909
 Myron Hamilton Beekman, Rosendale, NY, Class of 1909
 Charles Eli Corbin, Oxford, NY, Class of 1909
 Allen Dale Cloke, Rahway, NJ, Class of 1909
 Samuel S. Demarest, Bergenfield, NJ, Class of 1909 
 Frederick Foster Read, Arlington, NJ, Class of  1909
 F. Rudolph Steinke, Elizabeth, NJ, Class of 1909
 William Henry Wallace, Moorestown, NJ, Class of 1909
 Booz, Class of 1910
 Thomas Laughlin Hanson, Class of 1910
 Edwin Thomas Leslie, Class of 1910
 Arthur Thomas McMichael, Class of 1910
 E. T. Goode 1911
 Rogers 1911
 H. A. Smith 1911
 Alverson 1912
 Carpender 1912
 H. C. Cooper 1912
 Freystadt 1912

References

Rutgers
Rutgers Scarlet Knights football seasons
Rutgers Queensmen football